The Territorial Prelature of Esquel is a Catholic territorial prelature located in the town of Esquel in the Ecclesiastical province of Bahía Blanca in Argentina.

History
 On 14 March 2009, Pope Benedict XVI established the Territorial Prelature of Esquel from the Diocese of Comodoro Rivadavia.

Ordinaries
Prelates of Esquel
José Slaby, C.Ss.R. (14 March 2009 – present)

References

Roman Catholic dioceses in Argentina
Roman Catholic Ecclesiastical Province of Bahía Blanca
Christian organizations established in 2009
Roman Catholic dioceses and prelatures established in the 21st century
Territorial prelatures
2009 establishments in Argentina